This is a list of fictional feature films or miniseries which feature events of World War II in the narrative.

There is a separate list of World War II TV series.

Criteria 
 The film or miniseries must be concerned with World War II (or the War of Ethiopia and the Sino-Japanese War) and include events which feature as a part of the war effort.
 For short films, see the List of World War II short films.
 For documentaries, see the List of World War II documentary films and the List of Allied propaganda films of World War II.

Fictional feature films specifically pertaining to the Holocaust appear in the List of Holocaust films#Narrative films.

Common topics
Many aspects of this conflict have repeatedly been the subject of drama. These common subjects will not be linked when they appear in the film descriptions below:

Europe
Adolf Hitler, Nazis and Nazism
Nazi Germany (Third Reich)
Wehrmacht, Kriegsmarine, Luftwaffe and Schutzstaffel
Benito Mussolini and Fascism
Kingdom of Italy and Italian Social Republic
Royal Italian Army, Regia Marina and Regia Aeronautica
Death camps, Nazi concentration camps, earlier concentration camps
Partition and occupation of Poland and Polish resistance
Occupied France, Vichy France and French Resistance
Occupied Norway
The Holocaust

Asia–Pacific
Emperor Shōwa and Imperialism
Empire of Japan (Japanese Imperial)
Imperial Japanese Army and Imperial Japanese Navy
Non-geographical
POW

Films made during the War of Ethiopia and the Sino-Japanese War 
Before the Second World War explicitly began with the Nazi German, then later Soviet (Russian) invasions of Poland in September 1939, Germany had already absorbed Austria in the Anschluß of 1938, then the Czechoslovakian lands of Bohemia and Moravia. Meanwhile, Italy, Germany and the Soviet Union were involved in the Spanish Civil War, (1936–1939), and Italy had conquered Ethiopia (1935–1936) and Albania (1939). China had been fighting against Japan since the 1931 invasion of their northeastern province of Manchuria in a war that completely opened in 1937, called the Second Sino-Japanese War, until Japan attacked the U.S.A. at Pearl Harbor on 7 December 1941. then the British Empire and the Dutch East Indies colonial possessions also in December 1941.

1936

1937

1938

Films made during the Second World War 

Note: Soviet films are in Russian and originate in the Russian SFSR, unless otherwise noted.

1939

1940

1941

1942

1943

1944

1945

Late 1940s

Films made during the Cold War

Early 1950s

Late 1950s

Early 1960s

Late 1960s

Early 1970s

Late 1970s

Early 1980s

Late 1980s

Films made since the Cold War

Early 1990s

Late 1990s

Early 2000s

Late 2000s

Early 2010s

Late 2010s

Early 2020s

In development

Science fiction, fantasy and horror

TV series

Dramatised documentaries

A dramatised documentary is a documentary film which includes dramatised scenes using actors in costume.
This format is distinct from a docudrama, which is a fully dramatised fact-based fictional work in a documentary style.

Spanish Civil War

In the Spanish Civil War, the Nationalists (the rebel side) are supported by Mussolini's Italy, Hitler's Germany, and a small number of international rightist volunteers. The Republicans (government side) are supported by Stalin's Soviet Union and a large number of leftist volunteers, the International Brigades.

The Nationalists under Francisco Franco win.

During World War II, Franco remains neutral – so Gibraltar is never overrun – but nevertheless he sends the Blue Division to fight for Germany on the Eastern Front.

For films about the Blue Division, see the List of World War II films since 1950.

See also 
List of World War II short films
List of World War II documentary films
List of Allied propaganda films of World War II
List of Holocaust films
List of films based on war books – includes World War II section
List of partisan films – films about World War II in Yugoslavia

Of related interest
List of World War II video games

Notes 
  This English language title is a literal translation from its original foreign language title.This title should always be replaced by an English language release title when that information becomes available.

References 
 Sources
Leyda, Jay. Kino: A History of the Russian and Soviet Film – A study of the development of Russian cinema, from 1896 to the present. London: George Allen & Unwin, 1960. Princeton, New Jersey: Princeton University Press, 3rd edition, 1983. 513 pp.

External links
 World War 2 movies – reviews and trailers for popular World War II movies.
 Top 10 World War 2 Movies – List by Topyaps

Lists of World War II films
 
Lists of war films